Jean-Baptiste Romane (1807 - 1858) was an early Haitian poet and playwright. 

Romane is best known for his first work, the lyrical poem Hymne à l'Indépendance (Hymn to Independence). When France announced its official recognition of Haitian independence, Romane's poem was sung at the subsequent national celebration. His works were typically historic or patriotic; many celebrated the heroes of the Haitian Revolution. For one poem, Vers à la France, Romane was awarded a gold medallion by the French government.

Selected works

Poems 
A l'Artibonite
A l'Ozama
Hymne à l'Indépendance (1825)
Sur la Ville de Saint-Domingue

Plays 
La Mort de Christophe

References

 

1807 births
1858 deaths
Haitian male poets
Haitian male dramatists and playwrights
19th-century Haitian poets
19th-century Haitian dramatists and playwrights
19th-century male writers